The TF1 Tower is a building in the Boulogne-Billancourt suburb of Paris, used as the headquarters of the French TV channel TF1 and several subsidiaries of the TF1 Group since 1992.

Location
The TF1 Tower is located at the corner of Quai du Point-Du-Jour and Avenue Le-Jour-Se-Lève in the Point-Du-Jour neighborhood of Boulogne-Billancourt in the Hauts-de-Seine department, southwest of Paris. It is situated close to the Pont aval and the Pont d'Issy.

Architecture
The TF1 Tower is shaped as cylinder covered with reflective glass.

The direction offices are located on the upper floor. A webcam on the top of the tower broadcasts real-time pictures of Paris on TF1's official website as well as in TF1's news programme studio.

History
The building was designed by architect  and built by the Bouygues group. Its construction was decided after a delegated project management agreement dated March 20, 1991 and authorised by the administration council on April 11, 1991. The construction was invoiced €37.1 million in fiscal year 1991 and €18.8 million in fiscal year 1992. Thanks to a leasing contract, the TF1 Group became the owner of the tower on June 30, 2001.

According to journalists  and Henri Haguet, the new headquarters tower is symbolic of TF1's ideological shift toward productivity. TF1 also uses the tower for advertising and displaying.

On April 15, 2012, the façade was lit with a  screen that enabled the news programme to be watched from the banks of the Seine River.

In popular culture
In 1995, the tower was climbed with bare hands by Alain Robert.

In 2005, the TF1 Tower was featured in the introduction animated short film of Arthur's one-man-show Arthur en vrai.

In August 2007, an advertisement for video game Halo 3 showed the game's main character inside the TF1 Tower. Virals videos showed the character near the building's entrance and in the weather forecast studio.

In the November 28th, 2008 episode of Star Academy'''s eighth season, a special credit video shows kids climbing the tower to reach guest singer Britney Spears who landed on the roof with a helicopter.

In 1997, the tower appeared on the title page of Pierre Péan and Christophe Nick's pamphlet named TF1, un pouvoir. The building was also shown on the covers of the books TF1, une expérience (2006) and Madame, monsieur, bonsoir'' (2007).

Gallery

References

Buildings and structures in Hauts-de-Seine
Office buildings completed in 1992
Skyscrapers in France
Headquarters in France
Mass media company headquarters
Television in France
20th-century architecture in France